Alex Davies may refer to:

 Alex Davies (snooker player) (born 1987), English snooker player
 Alex Davies (cricketer) (born 1994), English cricketer
 Alex Davies (footballer) (born 2002), Australian rules footballer
 Alex Davies (musician), musician with the band Elliot Minor
 Alex Davies (rugby union) (born 1986), English rugby union player
 Alex Davies (terrorist) (born 1994 or 1995), Welsh convicted neo-Nazi